The Heroes of the Legion (Spanish:Los héroes de la legión) is a 1927 Spanish silent film directed by Rafael López Rienda. It was filmed on location in Spanish Morocco.

Cast
 Manuel Chávarri 
 Pablo Rossi 
 Carmen Sánchez 
 Ricardo Vargas
 Ricardo Vayos

References

Bibliography
  Eva Woods Peiró. White Gypsies: Race and Stardom in Spanish Musical Films. U of Minnesota Press, 2012.

External links

1927 films
Spanish silent films
Spanish black-and-white films